Germán Schreiber Waddington (1862 – August 16, 1930) was a Peruvian politician of Austrian descent. He was a member of the Civilista Party. He served in the Chamber of Deputies of Peru (1904–1908) and Senate of Peru. He served as Minister of Finance (1907–1908, 1910, 1914–1915) in the Government of Peru. He was twice Prime Minister of Peru (August–November 1910, November 1914 – February 1915). His father Aloys Schreiber was a consular agent of Austria in Huaraz, Ancash.

References

Bibliography 
 Basadre Grohmann, Jorge: Historia de la República del Perú (1822–1933), Tomo 12. Editada por la Empresa Editora El Comercio S. A. Lima, 2005.  (V.12)
 Tauro del Pino, Alberto: Enciclopedia Ilustrada del Perú. Tercera Edición. Tomo 15, SAL/SZY. Lima, PEISA, 2001. 

1862 births
1930 deaths
Peruvian people of Austrian descent
Civilista Party politicians
Members of the Chamber of Deputies of Peru
Members of the Senate of Peru
Peruvian Ministers of Economy and Finance